Biocytin is a chemical compound that is an amide formed from the vitamin biotin and the amino acid L-lysine.  As an intermediate in the metabolism of biotin, biocytin occurs naturally in blood serum and urine.

The enzyme biotinidase cleaves biocytin and makes biotin available to be reused by other enzymes.  Because biocytin is the natural substrate of the enzyme biotinidase, biocytin can be used to measure the biotinidase activity and therefore diagnose biotinidase deficiency.

Biocytin is also used in scientific research as a histological stain for nerve cells.

References

Carboxamides
Amino acid derivatives
Histology